Bess Kaiser Hospital was a hospital in Portland, Oregon, United States, which closed in 1998.

The hospital opened in 1959 and was the first postwar Portland-area hospital in Henry J. Kaiser's Permanente Foundation health care network. It was named after Henry J. Kaiser's wife Bess. The former location is now occupied by Adidas America Headquarters, Salomon North America Inc., and several physicians.

References

External links

 - Portland Business Journal
 - Portland Business Journal

Hospital buildings completed in 1959
Hospitals in Portland, Oregon
Hospitals established in 1959
Hospitals disestablished in 1998
Kaiser Permanente hospitals
1959 establishments in Oregon
1998 disestablishments in Oregon
Defunct hospitals in Oregon